Morris and Company, was one of several meatpacking companies in Chicago, Illinois, and in South Omaha, Nebraska.

History
Morris & Company was founded by Nelson Morris in Chicago. In 1902, with Nelson's son, Edward Morris as president, it agreed to merge with the other two (Armour & Company and Swift & Company) to form a giant corporation called the National Packing Company. Conceived primarily as a holding company, National Packing soon began buying up smaller meat companies, such as G. H. Hammond and Fowler.

Between 1904 and 1910, National Packing acquired 23 stockyards and slaughtering plants nationwide, which gave it control over about one-tenth of U.S. meat production. The company owned branches in over 150 cities around the world, along with a fleet of 2,600 refrigerated railcars.

Starting in 1905, the constituent companies in National Packing were targeted by Arba Seymour Van Valkenburgh under the Elkins Act. Pressure from U.S. government regulators forced the dissolution of National Packing in 1912, leaving the structure of the American meat industry about the same as it had been before 1902.

The demerged Armour ultimately absorbed Morris & Co. in 1922, with the deal finalized in 1923.

See also
 History of Omaha

References

Agriculture companies of the United States
Companies based in Chicago
Meat packing companies based in Omaha, Nebraska
Defunct companies based in Illinois
History of Chicago
History of Omaha, Nebraska
South Omaha, Nebraska
Defunct companies based in Nebraska